The William Ulmer Brewery is a brewery complex in Bushwick, Brooklyn, New York City. It consists of four buildings—an office, a brew house, an engine–machine house, and a stable–storage house—all constructed between 1872 and 1890 in the German round-arch style. The site is bounded by Belvidere Street to the southeast, Beaver Street to the northeast, and Locust Street to the northwest, with the address 31 Belvidere Street. The main brew house, the engine–machine house, and the office building were designed by Brooklyn architect Theobald Engelhardt, while the stable–storage house was designed by Frederick Wunder.

The Ulmer Brewery was one of over a dozen German-operated breweries that were built in Bushwick during the late 19th and early 20th centuries. It ceased to be an active brewery in 1920 due to Prohibition in the United States, which outlawed alcoholic beverage production.  The Ulmer family continued to own the office building until 1952; the other buildings were sold and used for light manufacturing, and the office building became a private residence. On May 11, 2010, the brewery was designated a New York City Landmark, becoming the first brewery in the city to receive this status.

History

Context 
Brewing was a major industry in New York City going back to the 18th century. though early development of breweries in Brooklyn was quite slow, with relatively few commercial brewers. When freshwater was discovered under northern Brooklyn during the late 19th century, including under Williamsburg and Bushwick, resulted in the development of breweries, where many German immigrants worked at the time. By 1880, there were 35 breweries in Brooklyn, including a 14-block "brewer's row" within Bushwick that contained at least 11 breweries. This coincided with a large increase in Germans settling Bushwick.

William Ulmer (1833–1907), an immigrant from the German territory of Württemberg, was one of the early settlers in the Bushwick brewery district. He was the nephew of both John F. Betz and Henry Clausen Sr., who in turn were brewers and apprentices of D.G. Yuengling Sr. In 1871, Ulmer and a Bavarian immigrant named Anton Vigelius founded the Vigelius & Ulmer Continental Lagerbier Brewery, at the intersection of Belvidere (formerly Ann) and Beaver Streets. Two years prior, Vigelius had bought the land from the Debevoises, and just before the brewery was constructed, had sold off his half-stake in the land to Ulmer.

Operations 
Construction was already underway by 1871, when an accident at the site killed three construction workers. The first buildings on the site, the brewery and a nearby residence, are thought to have been completed by the same year. The brewery was fairly successful, and in 1875 the Brooklyn Daily Eagle described the Vigelius & Ulmer brewery as one of the larger breweries in the Williamsburg area, out of 30 or 40 breweries operating in the neighborhood. Vigelius then relinquished his ownership stake in the brewery. Ulmer became its sole proprietor and subsequently reorganized it into the William Ulmer Brewery. In 1881, some workers went on strike to protest low wages.

Over the years, several improvements were made to the brewery to accommodate additional brewing capacity and to utilize advances in that industry. In 1880, a new storage house would be built on Beaver Street. Five years later, Theobald Engelhardt designed a large expansion that included an office building; machine and boiler structures; and a washroom and keg-filling room in the back of the main brewery building. Frederick Wunder would design a three-story brick stable and storage house in 1890, which replaced the stable building already on the site. The Eagle stated in 1886 that the counting-houses at Ulmer Brewery and several others in the area were "not surpassed by anything of the kind on Broadway or Wall Street". Additions would continue through the 1900s, including a 236-barrel container for cooking the brew, installed in 1906.

By 1896, Ulmer was described as a millionaire, and he lived at a large estate on Bushwick Avenue. Although there is no documentation to support that Ulmer operated any beer gardens to sell his beer, Ulmer did operate several facilities including Ulmer Park in Gravesend; Dexter Park in Woodhaven, Queens; and a beer pavilion in Forest Park, Queens. When Ulmer retired in 1900, the company was reincorporated with his son-in-law John W. Weber (1858–1933) as its president. Weber, as well as Ulmer's wife Catherine and his other son-in-law John F. Becker, served as directors of the newly reincorporated company. When Ulmer died in 1907, the brewery had become one of Brooklyn's largest. The brewery had produced  of beer a year at its peak. However, after the enactment of Prohibition, production of alcoholic beverages became illegal and the brewery closed in 1920.

Post-closure 
After closure, the brewery's buildings were sold and used for light manufacturing. The family continued to own the office building before selling it in 1952.

In 1985, Jay Swift, a stone sculptor and marble worker, purchased the office building and renovated it. At the time, the main building was used as a storage facility for a nearby lamp company. Swift would move out in the late 1990s, and the office building remained unoccupied for several years, as Swift had declined potential tenants who wanted to make extensive changes to the exterior. By 2008, The New York Times mentioned that a furniture designer lived in the office building. On May 11, 2010, the New York City Landmarks Preservation Commission designated the brewery an official city landmark, making it the first brewery to receive this status. At the time of the landmark decision, the office building was still being used as a home. , the residence was on sale for $4 million.

Architecture 
The William Ulmer Brewery's constituent structures include the main brew house and its annex; the engine–machine house; the office; and the stable–storage house. The main brew house and annex were designed by Brooklyn architect Theobald Engelhardt in 1872. Engelhardt went on to build the  house and the office building in 1885. The stable–storage house was designed by Frederick Wunder in 1890. Similar to other German breweries, the Ulmer Brewery buildings were largely designed in the American round-arch style, inspired by the German Renaissance Revival style or Rundbogenstil. As with other factory structures built in that era, regularly spaced window openings let in natural light but also allowed an "organization" and "dignity", while decorative brick facades allowed for both a fire-resistant material and a "relatively economical means of relieving plain brickwork".

Main brew house 
The main brew house, built in 1872 and expanded in 1881, is located at the western corner of Beaver and Belvidere Streets. It was originally  stories high and contained a mansard roof. Later expansions brought the building's height to four stories, with a flat roof. The main brewing house measures  along its northeastern elevation on Beaver Street, and  along its southeastern elevation on Belvidere Street.

The original structure, comprising the eastern two-thirds closer to the intersection of Beaver and Belvidere Streets, contains a facade with brick archivolts above the second through fourth floors' window openings, as well as archivolts at the bricked-over window openings on the first floor. In the original structure, there are three vertical window bays on each side, which are separated by projecting brick vertical pilasters and contain two archivolted windows on each floor. The first floor contains several doors and a roll-down metal gate on Beaver Street, but features few windows. The northwestern two-thirds of the Beaver Street (northeastern) facade contains a different window configuration, and its second and third floors contain rectangular windows without archivolts.

Engine–machine building 
On Belvidere Street, to the southwest of the brew house, is the engine–machine building, built as a two-and-three-story structure in 1885. It also contained brick archivolts; a projecting pilaster separating the building's two bays; and a cornice made of brick. The three-story portion is located just southwest of the main brew house, and their facades are flush with each other.

The northeastern half of the engine–machine building contains extra-high first- and second floors, such that the third floor of this building aligns with the fourth floor of the main brew house. This half of the building is composed of two bays, each with two windows. Combined with the main brew house, it makes a reverse "L" shape. The southeastern half is two stories, corresponding with the southwestern section of the main brew house. The first floor contains a garage as well as small window openings on the first floor. The facade has four windows on each floor with two windows to each bay. The first floor contains a garage.

Office building 

The two-story office building, completed in 1890, has the address 31 Belvidere Street. The two-story building was built in the Romanesque Revival style. It features a cobblestone facade, a slate-covered mansard roof, and terracotta ornament. The facade is divided into two bays: the outer bays contain two pairs of arched windows on the first floor and two dormered windows on the second floor. These flank the central bay, which contain a main archway on the first floor; an engraved sign with the letters "OFFICE" above the archway; a second floor with two windows; and a pediment above the second floor. A cobblestone driveway is located northeast of the office building.

Several additions have been built behind the original building, including a two-story brick structure and one-story cement structure.

Stable–storage building 
The stable building, completed in 1885, has the address 28 Locust Street, on the northwestern portion of the site. It measures  and is largely rectangular. The building is  stories high with a cellar that is located half a story below ground level. The facade is made of cobblestone, and the Locust Street facade has been split into three architectural bays, each with two windows. A cobblestone driveway runs to the northeast of the stable building. The last major structure to be developed for the brewery, the stable building contains archivolted windows on the third floor; parapets above the first and third floors; pilasters between the windows; and a pediment atop the center bay facing Locust Street. An elevator was constructed by 1932 in a separate shaft, possibly on a preexisting one-story building.

References

Sources
 
 

Beer brewing companies based in New York City
Industrial buildings and structures in Brooklyn
Bushwick, Brooklyn
New York City Designated Landmarks in Brooklyn